Deguelia is a genus of flowering plants in the legume family, Fabaceae. It belongs to the subfamily Faboideae. It may be synonymous with Derris.

Millettieae
Fabaceae genera